The 2012 Calgary Stampeders season was the 55th season for the team in the Canadian Football League and their 74th overall. The Stampeders finished in 2nd place in the West Division with a 12–6 record. The Stampeders won the West Semi-Final over the Saskatchewan Roughriders by a score of 36–30, earning their first playoff victory over Saskatchewan since 1994. The Stampeders then traveled to Vancouver and upset the 1st place BC Lions 34–29, advancing to the Grey Cup game. Calgary were the Grey Cup favourites by two points, but they lost 35–22 to the hometown Toronto Argonauts.

Offseason

CFL Draft
The 2012 CFL Draft took place on May 3, 2012. The Stampeders had eight selections in the six-round draft, after trading away their second round pick and acquiring additional picks in the third, fourth, and sixth rounds.

Preseason

Regular season

Season standings

Season schedule

Roster

Coaching staff

Playoffs

Schedule

West Semi-Final

West Final

Grey Cup

References

External links
2012 Calgary Stampeders at Official Site

Calgary Stampeders seasons
Calg
2012 in Alberta